Henry Campbell Greene (December 13, 1904 – April 27, 1967)  was an American mycologist at the University of Wisconsin. He was involved in the study of low prairie habitat and initiated the restoration, preservation, and protection of a parcel of restored prairie land. Greene co-discovered the erysiphe sparsa and erysiphe cichoracearum DC. var. latispora.  He committed suicide.

Further reading
Court, Franklin E. "Pioneers of Ecological Restoration: The People and Legacy of the University of Wisconsin Arboretum." Madison: University of Wisconsin Press (2012). p 139.

References

External links
"Arboretum Fete is Greene Tribune" from The Capital Times in 1967
“A Cabinet of Natural History”: The University of Wisconsin-Madison Herbarium’s Sesquicentennial, 1849–1999" from the University of Wisconsin Digital Collections

1904 births
1967 suicides
American mycologists
University of Wisconsin–Madison faculty
Suicides in Arizona